Russian is an East Slavic language of the Indo-European family. All Indo-European languages are descendants of a single prehistoric language, reconstructed as Proto-Indo-European, spoken sometime in the Neolithic era. Although no written records remain, much of the culture and religion of the Proto-Indo-European people can also be reconstructed based on their daughter cultures traditionally and continuing to inhabit most of Europe and South Asia, areas to where the Proto-Indo-Europeans migrated from their original homeland.

External history

Kievan Rus' period (9th–12th century) 

The common ancestor of the modern East Slavic languages, Old East Slavic, operated throughout Kievan Rus' ( 9th–13th century) as a spoken language. The earliest written record of the language, an amphora found at Gnezdovo, may date from the mid-10th century. In writing, Old Church Slavonic was the standard, although from the 11th century Rus' variations became distinguishable from Serb ones. Also in the 11th century, differences in written sources point to the slow emergence of distinct East Slavic languages. 

During the pre-Kievan period, the main sources of borrowings were Germanic languages, particularly Gothic and Old Norse. In the Kievan period, however, loanwords and calques entered the vernacular primarily from Old Church Slavonic and from Byzantine Greek:

Feudal and linguistic breakup (13th–14th century) 

Kievan Rus' began to decline and fragment in the 12th century. From the 12th and 13th centuries, regional phonetic and grammatical variations within Rus' Church Slavonic texts could be detected, indicating the divergence of what would eventually become the Russian and Ukrainian languages from the 14th through 18th centuries. Around  1200, and especially after the Sack of Kiev (1240) when Mongols and Tatars established the Golden Horde in Central and Northern Rus', an autonomous spoken Russian language, largely independent from written Church Slavonic, began to develop. Nevertheless, Church Slavonic remained the literary standard in these central and northern regions for several more centuries. 
After the Mongol invasion of Kievan Rus' in the 13th century, the vernacular language of the conquered peoples remained firmly Slavic. Turko-Mongol borrowings in Russian relate mostly to commerce and the military:

On the other hand, Ruthenian or Chancery Slavonic developed as a separate written form out of Old Church Slavonic, influenced by various local dialects and used in the chancery of the Grand Duchy of Lithuania, which came to dominate the western and southern lands of former Kievan Rus'.

The Moscow period (15th–17th centuries) 
After the Golden Horde gradually disintegrated in the late 15th and early 16th century, both the political centre and the predominant dialect in European Russia came to be based in the Grand Duchy of Moscow (Muscovy). A scientific consensus exists that Russian and Ruthenian had definitely become distinct by this time at the latest. The official language in Muscovy, the Tsardom of Russia and the early Russian Empire remained a kind of Church Slavonic until the close of the 18th century, but, despite attempts at standardization, as by Meletius Smotrytsky in  1620, its purity was by then strongly compromised by an incipient secular literature. Vocabulary was borrowed from Polish, and, through it, from German and other Western European languages. At the same time, a number of words of native (according to a general consensus among etymologists of Russian) coinage or adaptation appeared, at times replacing or supplementing the inherited Indo-European/Common Slavonic vocabulary.

Much annalistic, hagiographic, and poetic material survives from the early Muscovite period. Nonetheless, a significant amount of philosophic and secular literature is known to have been destroyed after being proclaimed heretical.

The material following the election of the Romanov dynasty in 1613 following the Time of Troubles is rather more complete.  Modern Russian literature is considered to have begun in the 17th century, with the autobiography of Avvakum and a corpus of chronique scandaleuse short stories from Moscow. Church Slavonic remained the literary language until the Petrine age (1682–1725), when its usage shrank drastically to biblical and liturgical texts. Legal acts and private letters had been, however, already written in pre-Petrine Muscovy in a less formal language, more closely reflecting spoken Russian. The first grammar of the Russian language was written by Vasily Adodurov in the 1740s, and a more influential one by Mikhail Lomonosov in 1755 (Rossijskaja grammatika). Lomonosov argued for the development of three separate styles of written Russian, in which the higher and middle styles (intended for "the more respectable literary genres") were still supposed to heavily draw upon Church Slavonic vocabulary. In the early 19th century, authors such as Karamzin and Pushkin set further literary standards, and by the year 2000, the common form of the Russian language had become a mixture of purely Russian and Church Slavonic elements.

Empire (18th–19th centuries) 

The political reforms of Peter the Great were accompanied by a reform of the alphabet, and achieved their goal of secularization and modernization.  Blocks of specialized vocabulary were adopted from the languages of Western Europe.  Most of the modern naval vocabulary, for example, is of Dutch origin.  Latin, French, and German words entered Russian for the intellectual categories of the Age of Enlightenment.  Several Greek words already in the language through Church Slavonic were refashioned to reflect post-Renaissance European rather than Byzantine pronunciation.  By 1800, a significant portion of the gentry spoke French, less often German, on an everyday basis.

At the same time, there began explicit attempts to fashion a modern literary language as a compromise between Church Slavonic, the native vernacular, and the style of Western Europe.  The writers Lomonosov, Derzhavin, and Karamzin made notable efforts in this respect, but, as per the received notion, the final synthesis belongs to Pushkin and his contemporaries in the first third of the 19th century.

During the 19th century, the standard language assumed its modern form; literature flourished. Spurred perhaps by the so-called Slavophilism, some terms from other languages fashionable during the 18th century now passed out of use (for example,   >  , 'victory'), and formerly vernacular or dialectal strata entered the literature as the "speech of the people". Borrowings of political, scientific and technical terminology continued.  By about 1900, commerce and fashion ensured the first wave of mass adoptions from German, French and English.

Soviet period and beyond (20th century) 
The political upheavals of the early 20th century and the wholesale changes of political ideology gave written Russian its modern appearance after the spelling reform of 1918. Reformed spelling, the new political terminology, and the abandonment of the effusive formulae of politeness characteristic of the pre-Revolutionary upper classes prompted dire statements from members of the émigré intelligentsia that Russian was becoming debased. But the authoritarian nature of the regime, the system of schooling it provided from the 1930s, and not least the often unexpressed yearning among the literati for the former days ensured a fairly static maintenance of Russian into the 1980s. Though the language did evolve, it changed very gradually. Indeed, while literacy became nearly universal, dialectal differentiation declined, especially in the vocabulary: schooling and mass communications ensured a common denominator.

The 1964 proposed reform was related to the orthography. In that year the Orthographic commission of the Institute of the Russian language (Academy of Sciences of the USSR), headed by Viktor Vinogradov, apart from the withdrawal of some spelling exceptions, suggested:
 retaining one partitive soft sign
 always writing  instead of  after 
 canceling the interchange in roots -zar/-zor, -rast/-rost, -gar/-gor, -plav/-plov etc.; canceling the double consonants in loan words
 writing only -yensk(iy) instead of two suffixes -insk(iy) and -yensk(iy), write only -yets instead of -yets or -its
 always writing with hyphen the "Пол-" (half-) combinations with subsequent genitive of noun or ordinal number
 writing the nouns beginning with vice-, unter-, ex- together instead of using hyphen
 writing all particles separately
 allowing the optional spelling of noun inflexions

The reform, however, failed to take root.

Political circumstances and the undoubted accomplishments of the superpower in military, scientific, and technological matters (especially cosmonautics), gave Russian a worldwide if occasionally grudging prestige, most strongly felt during the middle third of the 20th century.

The political collapse of 1990–1991 loosened the shackles. In the face of economic uncertainties and difficulties within the educational system, the language changed rapidly. There was a wave of adoptions, mostly from English, and sometimes for words with exact native equivalents.

At the same time, the growing public presence of the Russian Orthodox Church and public debate about the history of the nation gave new impetus to the most archaic Church Slavonic stratum of the language, and introduced or re-introduced words and concepts that replicate the linguistic models of the earliest period.

Russian today is a tongue in great flux. The new words entering the language and the emerging new styles of expression have, naturally, not been received with universal appreciation.

Examples
The following excerpts illustrate (very briefly) the development of the literary language.

Spelling has been partly modernized.  The translations are as literal as possible, rather than literary.

Primary Chronicle

c. 1110, from the Laurentian Codex, 1377

 .

 'These [are] the tales of the bygone years, whence is come the Russian land, who first began to rule at Kiev, and whence the Russian land has come about.'

Old East Slavic, the common ancestor of Russian, Ukrainian and Belarusian.  Fall of the yers in progress or arguably complete (several words end with a consonant;  'to rule' < , modern ). South-western (incipient Ukrainian) features include  'bygone'; modern Russian ).  Correct use of perfect and aorist:  'is/has come' (modern Russian ),  'began' (modern Russian  as a development of the old perfect.)  Note the style of punctuation.

The Tale of Igor's Campaign

. c. 1200(?), from the Catherine manuscript, c. 1790.

 

 'Would it not be meet, o brothers, for us to begin with the old words the difficult telling of the host of Igor, Igor Sviatoslavich?  And to begin in the way of the true tales of this time, and not in the way of Boyan's inventions.  For the wise Boyan, if he wished to devote to someone [his] song, would wander like a squirrel over a tree, like a grey wolf over land, like a bluish eagle beneath the clouds.'

Illustrates the sung epics. Yers generally given full voicing, unlike in the first printed edition of 1800, which was copied from the same destroyed prototype as the Catherine manuscript. Typical use of metaphor and simile.

Avvakum's autobiography
1672–73.  Modernized spelling.

And then they sent me to Siberia with my wife and children.  Whatever hardship there was on the way, there's too much to say it all, but maybe a small part to be mentioned.  The archpriest's wife [= My wife] gave birth to a baby; and we carted her, sick, all the way to Tobolsk; for three thousand versts, around thirteen weeks in all, we dragged [her] by cart, and by water, and in a sleigh half of the way.

Pure 17th-century central Russian vernacular.  Phonetic spelling ( 'it all, all of that', modern ).  A few archaisms still used (aorist in the perfective aspect  'was').  Note the way of transport to exile.

Alexandr Pushkin
From "Winter Evening", 1825.  Modern spelling. 
 Буря мглою небо кроет,
 Вихри снежные крутя;
 То, как зверь, она завоет,
 То заплачет, как дитя,
 То по кровле обветшалой
 Вдруг соломой зашумит,
 То, как путник запоздалый,
 К нам в окошко застучит.
 Tempest covers sky in haze[s],
 Twisting gales full of snow;
 Like a beast begins to howl,
 A cry, as if a child, it will let go,
 On the worn-out roof it will clamour
 Suddenly upon the thatch,
 Or as though a traveller tardy
 Starts to knock upon our hatch. (lit., window)

Modern Russian is sometimes said to begin with Pushkin, in the sense that the old "high style" Church Slavonic and vernacular Russian are so closely fused that it is difficult to identify whether any given word or phrase stems from the one or the other.

Fyodor Dostoevsky
From Crime and Punishment, 1866.  Modern spelling.

 

 In early July, during a spell of extraordinary heat, towards evening, a young man went out from his garret, which he sublet in S—— Lane, [entered] the street, and slowly, as though in [the grip of] indecision, began to make his way to K—— Bridge.

19th century prose.  No archaisms.  "European" syntax.

Fundamental laws of the Russian Empire
 (Constitution of the Russian Empire), 1906.  Modern spelling.

 

 "To the Emperor of all Russia belongs the Supreme Autocratic Power.  To obey His power, not merely in fear but also in conscience, God Himself does ordain."

Illustrates the categorical nature of thought and expression in the official circles of the Russian Empire.  Exemplifies the syntactic distribution of emphasis.

Mikhail Bulgakov
From The Master and Margarita, 1930–40

"You have always been a passionate proponent of the theory that upon decapitation human life comes to an end, the human being transforms into ashes, and passes into oblivion.  I am pleased to inform you, in the presence of my guests, though they serve as a proof for another theory altogether, that your theory is both well-grounded and ingenious.  Mind you, all theories are worth one another.  Among them is one, according to which every one shall receive in line with his faith. May that come to be!"

An example of highly educated modern speech (this excerpt is spoken by Woland).  See Russian humor for the essential other end of the spectrum.

Internal history
The modern phonological system of Russian is inherited from Common Slavonic but underwent considerable innovation in the early historical period before it was largely settled by about 1400.

Like other Slavic languages, Old East Slavic was a language of open syllables. All syllables ended in vowels; consonant clusters, with far less variety than today, existed only in the syllable onset. However, by the time of the earliest records, Old Russian already showed characteristic divergences from Common Slavonic.

Despite the various sound changes, Russian is in many respects a relatively conservative language, and is important in reconstructing Proto-Slavic:
 Russian largely preserves the position of the Proto-Slavic accent, including the complex systems of alternating stress in nouns, verbs and short adjectives.
 Russian consistently preserves  between vowels, unlike all other modern Slavic languages.
 Russian preserves palatalized consonants better than all other East and West Slavic languages, making it important for the reconstruction of yers.
 The Russian development of CerC, CorC, CĭrC, CŭrC and similar sequences is straightforward and in most cases easily reversible to yield the Proto-Slavic equivalent. Similarly the development of the strong yers is straightforward and preserves the front-back distinction. (But note that Russian shows early development of *CelC > *ColC and *CĭlC > *CŭlC, obscuring the front-back differences in these sequences.)

Vowels

Loss of yers

As with all other Slavic languages, the ultra-short vowels termed yers were lost or transformed. From the documentary evidence of Old East Slavic, this appears to have happened in the 12th century, about 200 years after its occurrence in Old Church Slavonic. The result was straightforward, with reflexes that preserve the front-back distinction between the yers in nearly all circumstances:
 Strong  > , with palatalization of the preceding consonant
 Strong  > , without palatalization of the preceding consonant
 Weak  is lost, with palatalization of the preceding consonant
 Weak  is lost, without palatalization of the preceding consonant
See the article on yers for the hypothesized pronunciation of these sounds and the meaning of the strong vs. weak distinction.

Examples:
 Old East Slavic   > Russian   "about me"
 Old East Slavic   > Russian   "sleep (nom. sg.)", cognate with Lat. somnus
 Old East Slavic   > Russian   "of sleep (gen. sg.)"

The loss of the yers caused the phonemicization of palatalized consonants and led to geminated consonants and a much greater variety of consonant clusters, with attendant voicing and/or devoicing in the assimilation:
 Old East Slavic   > Russian   ('where').

Unlike most other Slavic languages, so-called yer tensing (the special development of  >  and  >  for some yers preceding ) did not happen in Russian, nor was  later lost. Yers preceding  developed as elsewhere; when dropped, a sequence Cʲj developed, which is preserved as such only in Russian. The main exception to the  lack of yer tensing is in long adjectives, where nominative  becomes expected  (oj) only when stressed, but yer-tensed  (yj) elsewhere, and nominative  (which is never stressed) always becomes yer-tensed  (ij).

Some yers in weak position developed as if strong to avoid overly awkward consonant clusters:
 Proto-Slavic  "stem, stalk" >  (stebló) (cf.
 Proto-Slavic  "variegated" >  (pjóstryj) (cf. Polish , but Czech )
 Proto-Slavic  "to ring, to clank" >  (zvenétʹ) (cf. Old Czech , Czech )

As shown, Czech and especially Polish are more tolerant of consonant clusters than Russian; but Russian is still more tolerant than Serbo-Croatian or Bulgarian: Proto-Slavic  "mist, haze" >  (mgla) (cf. Old Czech , Polish , but Serbo-Croatian , Bulgarian  (măglá) ).

Loss of nasal vowels
The nasal vowels (spelled in the Cyrillic alphabet with yuses), which had developed from Common Slavic  and  before a consonant, were replaced with nonnasalized vowels:
 Proto-Slavic  > Russian u
 Proto-Slavic  > Russian ja (i.e.  with palatalization or softening of the preceding consonant)

Examples:
 PIE  "they are" > Proto-Slavic  >  (sutʹ)  (literary in modern Russian; cf. Old Church Slavonic  (sǫtĭ), Polish , Latin )
 Proto-Slavic  "hand" > Russian  (ruká) (cf. Polish , Lithuanian )
 Proto-Slavic  "meat" > Russian  (mjáso) (cf. Polish , Old Church Slavonic  (męso), Old Prussian mensa, Gothic  (mims), Sanskrit  (māṃsa))
 PIE  "five" >> Proto-Slavic  > Russian  (pjátʹ) (cf. Polish , Old Church Slavonic  (pętĭ), Lithuanian , Ancient Greek  (pénte), Sanskrit  (páñcan))

If the preceding consonant was already soft, no additional palatalization occurred, and the result is written  rather than  when following the palatal consonants  (š ž č šč c):
 Proto-Slavic  "to begin" > Russian  (načatʹ) (cf. Old Church Slavonic  (načęti))
 Proto-Slavic  "harvest" > Russian  (žátva) (cf. Old Church Slavonic  (žętva))

Borrowings in the Uralic languages with interpolated  after Common Slavonic nasal vowels have been taken to indicate that the nasal vowels existed in East Slavic until some time possibly just before the historical period.

Loss of prosodic distinctions
In earlier Common Slavic, vowel length was allophonic, an automatic concomitant to vowel quality, with     short and all other vowels (including nasal vowels) long. By the end of the Common Slavic period, however, various sound changes (e.g. pre-tonic vowel shortening followed by Dybo's law) produced contrastive vowel length. This vowel length survives (to varying extents) in Czech, Slovak, Serbian, Croatian, Slovenian and Old Polish, but was lost entirely early in the history of Russian, with almost no remnants.

Proto-Slavic accentual distinctions (circumflex vs. acute vs. neoacute) were also lost early in the history of Russian. It has often been hypothesized that the accentual distinctions were first converted into length distinctions, as in West Slavic, followed by the loss of distinctive vowel length. Pretty much the only reflex of the accentual type is found in the stress pattern of pleophonic sequences like CereC, CoroC, ColoC (where C = any consonant); see below.

Notably, however, the position (as opposed to the type) of the accent was largely preserved in Russian as a stress-type accent (whereas the Proto-Slavic accent was a pitch accent). The complex stress patterns of Russian nouns, verbs and short adjectives are a direct inheritance from Late Common Slavic, with relatively few changes.

Pleophony and CVRC sequences
The specific sound changes involved are as follows:

 *CerC > CereC
 *CorC > CoroC
 *CelC, *ColC > ColoC
 *CьrC > CerC
 *CъrC > CorC
 *CьlC, *CъlC > ColC

Examples:
 Proto-Slavic  "bank (of a river), shore" > Russian  (béreg); cf. Old Church Slavonic  (brěgŭ)
 Proto-Slavic  "beard" > Russian  (borodá); cf. Old Church Slavonic  (brada)
 Proto-Slavic  "milk" > Russian  (molokó); cf. Old Church Slavonic  (mlěko)
 Proto-Slavic  "ear (of corn), spike" > Russian  (kólos); cf. Old Church Slavonic  (klasŭ)

Note that Church Slavonic influence has made it less common in Russian than in modern Ukrainian and Belarusian:
 Ukrainian:  
 Russian:   ('Vladimir') (although a familiar form of the name in Russian is still  ).

When a Proto-Slavic sequence like *CerC was accented, the position of the accent in the resulting pleophonic sequence depends on the type of accent (circumflex, acute or neoacute). This is one of the few places in Russian where different types of accents resulted in differing reflexes. In particular, a sequence like CéreC, with the stress on the first syllable, resulted from a Proto-Slavic circumflex accent, while a sequence like CeréC, with the stress on the second syllable, resulted from a Proto-Slavic acute or neoacute accent. Examples:

 Proto-Slavic  "town" (circumflex) >  (górod)
 Proto-Slavic  "doorsill" (acute) >  (poróg)
 Proto-Slavic  "king" (neoacute) >  (korólʹ)

Development of *i and *y
Proto-Slavic  and  contrasted only after alveolars and labials. After palatals only  occurred, and after velars only  occurred. With the development of phonemic palatalized alveolars and labials in Old East Slavic,  and  no longer contrasted in any environment, and were reinterpreted as allophones of each other, becoming a single phoneme . Note that this reinterpretation entailed no change in the pronunciation and no mergers. Hence, for example, Old Russian   became modern  .

The yat vowel

They apparently remained distinct until the 18th century, although the timeline of the merger has been debated. They still remain distinct in some Russian dialects, as well as in Ukrainian, where Proto-Slavic    developed into  respectively. The letter  remained in use until 1918; its removal caused by far the greatest of all Russian spelling controversies.

The yo vowel
Proto-Slavic stressed  developed into , spelled , when following a soft consonant and preceding a hard one. The shift happened after , which were still soft consonants at the time. The preceding consonant remained soft.
 OR   ('about which' loc. sg.) > R  

That has led to a number of alternations:

This development occurred prior to the merger of ѣ (yat) with е, and ѣ did not undergo this change, except by later analogy in a short list of words as of about a century ago. Nowadays, the change has been reverted in two of those exceptional words.
  'threading needle, bodkin'
  'nests'
  'glandule' (however  'piece of iron')
  '[he/it is] depicted; [he/it is] imprinted (in the mind)'
  'stars'
  '[he] used to yawn'
  'jibe'
  '[it is] (never) worn'
  '[he] found'
  'saddles'
  'apprehension'
  '[he] flowered, flourished'
  '[he] used to put on' (this word has fallen into disuse in the standard language)
  'fuel, chips; instigation; firebrand' (this word has fallen into disuse in the standard language)
  'way-mark' (now )
  'mole cricket', 'mole rat' (now )

Loanwords from Church Slavonic reintroduced  between a (historically) soft consonant and a hard one, creating a few new minimal pairs:

This sound change also occurred in Belarusian as seen in the word for "flax": Belarusian and Russian  .

Vowel reduction
Modern Russian has extensive reduction of unstressed vowels, with the following mergers:

The underlying vowel resurfaces when stressed in related forms or words, cf. (baldá)  "sledgehammer", with genitive plural  (bald) , vs.  (kormá) , with genitive plural  (korm) . See Vowel reduction in Russian for more details.

Consonants

Consonant cluster simplification
 Common Slavonic   "soap" > Russian:  (mylo)  (cf. Polish )

Consonant clusters created by the loss of yers were sometimes simplified, but are still preserved in spelling:
  (zdravstvujte)  "hello" (first v rarely pronounced; such a pronunciation might indicate that the speaker intends to give the word its archaic meaning "be healthy")
  (sérdce)  "heart" (d not pronounced), but d is pronounced in the genitive plural  (sérdec) )
  (solnce)  "sun" (l not pronounced), but l is pronounced in adjectival  (sólnečnyj) "solar" and diminutive  (sólnyško) "small sun, sweetheart"

Development of palatalized consonants
Otherwise, palatalized consonants appeared allophonically before front vowels. At the same time, which was already a part of the vocalic system, was reanalyzed as an allophone of  after hard consonants, prompting leveling that caused vowels to alternate according to the preceding consonant rather than vice versa.

This is reflected in spelling, which writes e.g.

Depalatalization
Similarly  did not depalatalize, becoming  (formerly and still occasionally ).

This is generally reflected in spelling. Examples:
 Proto-Slavic  "to stick" > Russian  (lʹnutʹ)
 Proto-Slavic  "sun" > Russian  (sólnce)
 Proto-Slavic  "ox-yoke" > Russian  (jarmó); but Proto-Slavic  "bitter" > Russian  (gorʹkij)
 Proto-Slavic  "ancient" > Russian  (drévnij)
 Proto-Slavic  "cowberry" >> Russian  (brusníka)

Incomplete early palatalizations
This is the so-called incomplete second and third palatalizations:
 Ukrainian  
 Russian:   ('leg' dat.)
It is debated whether these palatalizations never occurred in these cases or were due to later analogical developments. A relevant data point in this respect is the Old Novgorod dialect, where the second palatalization is not reflected in spelling and may never have happened.

Development of palatal consonants
The Proto-Slavic palatal series of consonants (not to be confused with the later palatalized consonants that developed in Russian) developed as follows:
 The palatal resonants  merged with the new palatalized consonants *lʲ *nʲ *rʲ that developed before Proto-Slavic front vowels.
 The palatal fricatives  hardened into retroflex  (although the affricate  remained as soft ).

Degemination
Many double consonants have become degeminated but are still written with two letters.

(In a 1968 study, long  remains long in only half of the words in which it appears written, but long  did so only a sixth of the time. The study, however, did not distinguish spelling from actual historical pronunciation, since it included loanwords in which consonants were written doubled but never pronounced long in Russian.)

Effect of loanwords
A number of the phonological features of Russian are attributable to the introduction of loanwords (especially from non-Slavic languages), including:
 Sequences of two vowels within a morpheme. Only a handful of such words, like  'spider' and  'slap in the face' are native.
  'poet'.  From French poète.
  'mourning'. From German Trauer.
Word-initial , except for the root эт-.
  'era'.  From German Ära
Word-initial . (Proto-Slavic *a- > Russian ja-)
  'avenue. From French avenue.
  'swindle'. From French affaire.
  'lamb'. From Church Slavonic
The phoneme  (see Ef (Cyrillic) for more information).
  'phoneme'.  From Greek φώνημα.
  'ether'. From Greek αἰθήρ.
  'fiasco'. From Italian fiasco. 
The occurrence of non-palatalized consonants before  within roots. (The initial  of a suffix or flexion invariably triggers palatalization of an immediately preceding consonant, as in  /  / .)
The sequence  within a morpheme.
  ) 'gin' from English.
   'jazz' from English.

Morphology and syntax

Some of the morphological characteristics of Russian are:
 Loss of the vocative case
 Loss of the aorist and imperfect tenses (still preserved in Old Russian)
 Loss of the short adjective declensions except in the nominative
 Preservation of all Proto-Slavic participles

See also

 History of the Slavic languages
 Russian language
 Old East Slavic language
 Russian alphabet
 Russian orthography
 Reforms of Russian orthography
 Russian phonology
 Russian grammar
 Russian etymology
 Russian Language Institute

References

Bibliography

 Paul Clemens and Elena Chapovalova, Les mots Russes par la racine (Essai de vocabulaire Russe contemporain par l'étymologie)- 

 

 Alexander G. Preobrazhensky, Columbia University Press, 1983 – 
 Serguei Sakhno, Dictionnaire russe–français d'étymologie comparée: correspondences lexicales historiques – 

 Kiparsky, Valentin, Russische Historische Grammatik, 3 vols., 1963, 1967, 1975.
 Max Vasmer:  (Russisches Etymologisches Wörterbuch, 4 volumes, Heidelberg, 1950–58; Russian translation 1964–73).

 Terence Wade, Russian etymological dictionary, Duckworth Publishing, 1996 –

External links